"Sometimes You Can't Make It on Your Own" is a song by Irish rock band U2. It is the third track on their eleventh studio album, How to Dismantle an Atomic Bomb (2004), and was released as the album's second single worldwide except in North America on 7 February 2005. Originally titled "Tough", the song is lyrically about the relationship between the band's lead vocalist Bono and his father Bob Hewson, who died of cancer in 2001.

It debuted at number one on the UK Singles Chart becoming the band's sixth number-one single in the United Kingdom. It also topped the charts in Canada, Scotland and Spain, and reached the top 10 in Denmark, Ireland, Italy, the Netherlands and Norway. The song won two Grammy Awards at the 48th Annual Grammy Awards ceremony in 2006: Best Rock Performance by a Duo or Group with Vocal and Song of the Year.

Background and writing
Lead vocalist Bono and guitarist the Edge first began working on the song during U2's 1997–1998 PopMart Tour. During the recording of U2's 2000 album All That You Can't Leave Behind, Bono was aware that his father, Bob Hewson, was in the terminal stages of a bout with cancer. At that point, the song had the working title of "Tough", as that was the impression Bono always had of his father; he called him: "A tough old boot of a guy. Irish, Dub, north side Dubliner, very cynical about the world and the people in it, but very charming and funny with it." The Edge said that when the band played the song together, "it was a bit cloying". Bassist Adam Clayton said the song in its original form "had a very traditional feel", and that the group spent extensive time trying to change "the harmonic content" while still "retaining the strong melodies". The band subsequently decided not to release the song on All That You Can't Leave Behind. After Bob died in 2001, Bono sang a version of the song at his funeral. 

During the recording of U2's following album How to Dismantle an Atomic Bomb, they revisited the song. The group continued to struggle with it, as the Edge felt the chord sequence was too obvious. Producer Daniel Lanois aided the band with the beginning of the song. At Bono's suggestion, the bass in the verses was dropped a tone before the relative minor, a change the band believed had been a breakthrough. After what Clayton estimated to be about the third or fourth rewrite of the song, producer Steve Lillywhite listened to it with Bono and the Edge. He critiqued the track, telling them that it did not have a chorus and that each verse simply was followed by the line "sometimes you can't make it on your own". Lillywhite thought that the track needed "a bridge to lift it to the chorus line". Bono then asked for a guitar to play and spontaneously, in falsetto, sang the lines "And it's you when I look na na na na / And it's you du du du du du du du / Sometimes you can't make it on your own". Even though Bono had not yet written the rest of the lyrics for this new segment, Lillywhite said: "all of a sudden the song was finished. That song had been around for the best part of five years and no one had ever said to them that it didn't have a chorus." Bono recorded his vocals in a single take during a visit by Interscope Records chairman Jimmy Iovine to the studio.

Release
"Sometimes You Can't Make It on Your Own" was released in the United Kingdom on 7 February 2005 and in Australia the following week. In the former country,  the song was added to BBC Radio 1's C-list playlist on 29 December 2004. It moved to the B-list a week later and to the A-list a week after that. In the United States, the song was added to several radio formats between February and March. In Canada, the song was released on 22 March 2005, a month after "All Because of You" was issued there.

Chart performance
The song debuted at number one in the UK, marking the first time that a U2 album has produced two UK number 1 hits (following "Vertigo" in November 2004).

The single was also the third release in the United States. It reached number 15 on the Adult Top 40 chart, and number 29 on the Modern Rock Tracks chart in April 2005. It also reached number 97 on the Billboard Hot 100.

Formats and track listings

Charts

Weekly charts

Year-end charts

Release history

See also
 List of covers of U2 songs – Sometimes You Can't Make It on Your Own
 List of number-one singles of 2005 (Canada)
 List of number-one singles of 2005 (Spain)
 2005 in British music charts

References
Footnotes

Bibliography

External links
 Top40-Charts.com – "Sometimes You Can't Make It On Your Own" Single Charts Page – last accessed on 26 October 2005
 [ All Music – U2 Charts and Awards] – last accessed on 26 October 2005

2004 songs
2005 singles
Commemoration songs
Grammy Award for Song of the Year
Canadian Singles Chart number-one singles
Number-one singles in Scotland
UK Singles Chart number-one singles
U2 songs
Rock ballads
Island Records singles
Interscope Records singles
Song recordings produced by Jacknife Lee
Songs written by Bono
Songs written by the Edge
Songs written by Adam Clayton
Songs written by Larry Mullen Jr.
Song recordings produced by Chris Thomas (record producer)
Song recordings produced by Steve Lillywhite
Music videos directed by Phil Joanou
Black-and-white music videos
Number-one singles in Spain
Song recordings produced by Nellee Hooper